This page summarises the Australia national soccer team fixtures and results in 2004.

Summary

2004 commenced with a trip to Venezuela for a first ever meeting with the Venezuela national football team in a friendly which finished 1–1 after an injury time equaliser to the hosts. This was followed by a 1–0 friendly win in London over South Africa. Following this Australia hosted Turkey in a two-match friendly series. The Turks were ranked 7th in the world at the time and won both fixtures, 3–1 in Sydney  and then 1–0 in Melbourne.

In late May and early June Australia hosted the final tournament of the 2004 OFC Nations Cup in Adelaide. The tournament doubled as qualification for the 2006 FIFA World Cup. Australia largely cruised through their matches although a surprise 2–2 draw with Solomon Islands in the last game meant the two nations would meet again in a two-legged playoff to determine the OFC Nations champions.

These fixtures took place in October. Australia comfortably won both legs. A 5–1 win in Honiara was followed with a 6–0 win in Sydney to be crowned OFC Nations champions and qualify for the 2005 FIFA Confederations Cup.

The year ended with a 2–2 friendly draw in London to Norway.

Record

Match results

Friendlies

OFC Nations Cup & World Cup Qualifiers

Goal scorers

References

2004
2004 in Australian soccer
2004 national football team results